Mutnaya is the name of several rural localities in Russia:
Mutnaya (village), Dobryansky District, Perm Krai, a village in Dobryansky District, Perm Krai
Mutnaya (settlement), Dobryansky District, Perm Krai, a settlement in Dobryansky District, Perm Krai